The Central African Republic national under-20 football team, nicknamed Les Fauves, is the national team of the Central African Republic and is controlled by the Central African Football Federation. They are a member of CAF. Despite being traditionally one of the weakest teams in Africa and the world, they recently achieved success.

History
The Central Africa Republic under-20 national football team isn't much strong like others neighbors countries youth teams. They doesn't play much matches yet. The first ever glory of the team qualified for 2021 Africa U-20 Cup of Nations. The team has finished their journey till Quarter-finals. Nowadays the football governing body of the country trying to make their age levels teams strong so that can give the some future star players for the age levels and national teams.

Players
The following squad was selected recently finished 2021 CAF U-20 Cup of Nations.

Recent fixtures & results

2020

2021

Competitive records

FIFA U-20 World Cup

Africa U-20 Cup of Nations

*Draws include knockout matches decided by penalty shootout.

UNIFFAC U-20 Cup

References

Football in the Central African Republic
African national under-20 association football teams